The 1992 Major League Baseball draft took place on June 1, 1992, through a conference call involving all 28 MLB teams of the time. Phil Nevin of Cal State Fullerton was the first overall selection, chosen by the Houston Astros. Derek Jeter, selected for the National Baseball Hall of Fame in January 2020, was selected by the New York Yankees with the sixth selection. In addition to Nevin, Paul Shuey, B. J. Wallace, Jeffrey Hammonds, and Chad Mottola were selected ahead of Jeter.

Background
The 1993 expansion Colorado Rockies and Florida Marlins participated in the MLB Draft for the first time in 1992.

With the first overall selections of the previous two drafts, Chipper Jones and Brien Taylor, receiving signing bonuses of $1.2 million ($ in current dollar terms) and $1.55 million ($ in current dollar terms) respectively, salary demands of new players became a factor in the 1992 draft. Prior to the draft, Jeffrey Hammonds of the Stanford Cardinal baseball team sought a signing bonus of $1.8 million ($ in current dollar terms). Derek Jeter, a high school player who had a commitment to play college baseball at the University of Michigan, was believed to be seeking a bonus of at least $1 million ($ in current dollar terms) to forego college.

The Astros, holding the first overall selection, were keenly aware of the bonus demands of Hammonds and Jeter, as they were unable to sign their first-round pick in the 1991 MLB draft, John Burke, who held out for a bonus of $500,000 ($ in current dollar terms) as the sixth overall selection. They selected Phil Nevin, the 1992 College World Series Most Outstanding Player, with the first overall selection. In addition to perceiving Nevin as close to MLB-ready, needing little development in minor league baseball, Nevin also did not seek a large signing bonus. He agreed to sign with the Astros for $700,000 ($ in current dollar terms). Astros' scout Hal Newhouser quit in protest, as he had insisted to Astros' management that they should choose Jeter.

The teams with the first four selections, the Astros, Cleveland Indians, Montreal Expos, and Baltimore Orioles, had the four lowest payrolls in MLB. The Cleveland Indians selected Paul Shuey out of the University of North Carolina with the second selection, who they projected could develop into a closer comparable to Rob Dibble. The Expos, who preferred Hammonds, drafted B. J. Wallace instead, as they were unable to afford Hammonds' salary demands. The Orioles selected Hammonds with the fourth overall selection; he signed with the Orioles for $975,000 ($ in current dollar terms), the largest signing bonus given out in the 1992 Draft. With the fifth pick, the Reds chose Chad Mottola from the University of Central Florida (UCF), making Mottola the first UCF athlete to be chosen in the first round of a professional sports draft. He signed with the Reds the day of the draft for $400,000 ($ in current dollar terms).

Yankees scout Dick Groch, assigned to scout in the Midwest, watched Jeter participate in an all-star camp held at Western Michigan University, and came away sold by Jeter's talent. Though the Yankees were also concerned that Jeter might attend college, Grouch convinced the team to select Jeter. Regarding the possibility Jeter would attend Michigan, Groch said "the only place Derek Jeter's going is to Cooperstown", referring to the home city of the Baseball Hall of Fame. Jeter signed with the Yankees for $800,000 ($ in current dollar terms).

Scott Boras advised Charles Johnson and Michael Tucker. Those players fell in the first round as their perceived salary demands were too high for many teams.

First round selections

Sources: 1st Round of the 1992 MLB June Amateur Draft Baseball-Reference.com

Compensation picks

Other notable players

Jon Lieber, 2nd round, 44th overall by the Pittsburgh Pirates
Bob Wolcott, 2nd round, 52nd overall by the Seattle Mariners
Todd Helton, 2nd round, 55th overall by the San Diego Padres, but did not sign
Jason Giambi, 2nd round, 58th overall by the Oakland Athletics
Jamie Howard, 2nd round, 59th overall by the Atlanta Braves
Chris Widger, 3rd round, 82nd overall by the Seattle Mariners
Chris Gomez, 3rd round, 84th overall by the Detroit Tigers
Doug Mirabelli, 5th round, 131st overall by the San Francisco Giants
José Vidro, 6th round, 155th overall by the Montreal Expos
Aaron Fultz, 6th round, 159th overall by the San Francisco Giants
Bill Simas, 6th round, 160th overall by the California Angels
Scott Karl, 6th round, 164th overall by the Milwaukee Brewers
Jamie Walker, 10th round, 265th overall by the Houston Astros
Frank Catalanotto, 10th round, 280th overall by the Detroit Tigers
Scot McCloughan, 10th round, 289th overall by the Toronto Blue Jays
Casey Blake, 11th round, 305th overall by the Philadelphia Phillies, but did not sign
Craig Counsell, 11th round, 319th overall by the Colorado Rockies
Bobby Higginson, 12th round, 336th overall by the Detroit Tigers
Doug Mientkiewicz, 12th round, 345th overall by the Toronto Blue Jays, but did not sign
Darin Erstad, 13th round, 357th overall by the New York Mets, but did not sign
Mark Hendrickson, 13th round, 369th overall by the Atlanta Braves, but did not sign
Todd Greene, 14th round, 391st overall by the St. Louis Cardinals
Juan Acevedo, 14th round, 403rd overall by the Colorado Rockies
Scott Schoeneweis, 15th round, 407th overall by the Montreal Expos, but did not sign
José Cruz Jr., 15th round, 425th overall by the Atlanta Braves, but did not sign
Bubba Trammell, 15th round, 436th overall by the Baltimore Orioles, but did not sign
Bobby Bonds Jr., 18th round, 505th overall by the San Diego Padres
Ryan Franklin, 23rd round, 642nd overall by the Seattle Mariners
Mike DeJean, 24th round, 662nd overall by the New York Yankees
Geoff Jenkins, 24th round, 673rd overall by the San Diego Padres, but did not sign
Rich Aurilia, 24th round, 678th overall by the Texas Rangers
Quinton McCracken, 25th round, 711th overall by the Colorado Rockies
Mark Brandenburg, 26th round by the Texas Rangers
Matt Morris, 26th round, 724th overall by the Milwaukee Brewers, but did not sign
Brendan Donnelly, 27th round, 764th overall by the Chicago White Sox
Joe McEwing, 28th round, 783rd overall by the St. Louis Cardinals
Bob Howry, 29th round, 797th overall by the Houston Astros, but did not sign
Raúl Ibañez, 36th round, 1006th overall by the Seattle Mariners
T. J. Mathews, 36th round, 1007th overall by the St. Louis Cardinals
Gary Matthews Jr., 38th round, 1074th overall by the Minnesota Twins, but did not sign
Scott Sullivan, 39th round, 1088th overall by the Milwaukee Brewers, but did not sign
Mark Redman, 41st round, 1148th overall by the Detroit Tigers, but did not sign
Jermaine Dye, 43rd round, 1210th overall by the Texas Rangers, but did not sign
Robert Fick, 45th round, 1264th overall by the Oakland Athletics, but did not sign
Tim Cossins, 45th round, 1267th overall by the Pittsburgh Pirates, but did not sign
Mike Lowell, 48th round, 1352nd overall by the Chicago White Sox, but did not sign
Marvin Benard, 50th round, 1391st overall by the San Francisco Giants

NBA players drafted
 Erick Strickland, 31st round, 880th overall by the Florida Marlins

NFL players drafted 
 John Lynch, 2nd round, 66th overall by the Florida Marlins
 Danan Hughes, 3rd round, 79th overall by the Milwaukee Brewers
 Robert Chancey, 6th round by the Baltimore Orioles
 Danny Kanell, 19th round, 528th overall by the Milwaukee Brewers, but did not sign
 Lawyer Milloy, 29th round, 798th overall by the Cleveland Indians, but did not sign
 Terrell Buckley, 38th round, 1069th overall by the Atlanta Braves
 Mark Brunell, 44th round, 1237th overall by the Atlanta Braves, but did not sign
 Bert Emanuel, 49th round, 1379th overall by the Pittsburgh Pirates, but did not sign

See also

 List of first overall Major League Baseball draft picks

External links
 Complete draft list from The Baseball Cube database

References

Major League Baseball draft
Draft
Major League Baseball draft